The Birth of Venus is an oil-on-canvas painting by French artist François Boucher, created in 1754. It is held now in the Wallace Collection, in London.

References

1754 paintings
Mythological paintings by François Boucher
Paintings in the Wallace Collection
Bathing in art
Birds in art
Fish in art
Paintings of Venus